LFH may refer to:

Luftverkehr Friesland-Harle, an airline based in Harle, Germany
Low-force helix, a 60-pin electrical connector
Linux Filesystem Hierarchy, the directory structure of Linux operating systems
Lycée Franco-Hellénique Eugène Delacroix, a French international school in the Athens, Greece metropolitan area
Lycée Franco-Hondurien, a French international school in Tegucigalpa, Honduras